Bog vozi Mercedes is the seventh studio album by Bosnian rock band Zabranjeno Pušenje, released in December 2001. It was released through Menart Records and TLN-Europa in Croatia and Active Time in Yugoslavia.

Track listing
Source: Discogs

Samples 
The album contains samples of the choir of "Gazi Husref-begova medresa" and Hafiz Abdurahman Sulejman.

Personnel 
Credits adapted from the album's liner notes.

Zabranjeno Pušenje
Sejo Sexon – lead vocals, acoustic guitar
Dragomir Herendić – acoustic guitar, electric guitar, accordion, keyboards, tambura
Bruno Urlić Prco – violin, viola, keyboards, backing vocals
Branko Trajkov Trak – drums, percussion, backing vocals
Predrag Bobić Bleka – bass
Albin Jarić (credited as Jimi Rasta von Zenica) – percussion

Additional musicians
Zdenka Kovačiček – vocals (track 5)
Ivanka Mazurkijević – vocals (waitress role) (track 7)
Ibrica Jusić – vocals (track 11) 
Comdr. Žarko Radić Jastreb – reciting (track 10)
Vanja Alić – backing vocals (track 9)
Zoran Moro – vocals (reporter role) (track 3)
Mirjana Holček – backing vocals (track 9)
Trajko Simonovski Taci – fretless guitar (tracks 1, 6, 8)
Mihail Parušev Miško – drums (tracks 8, 14)
Marijan Jukić – soprano saxophone, saxophone
Tomica Rukljić – trumpet
Šogi – accordion  (track 5)

Production
 Sejo Sexon – production
 Dragomir Herendić Dragianni – production, sound engineering, programming, audio mixing, looping
 Dario Vitez – executive production
 Josip Kepe – sound engineering
 Zoran Švigir Švigi – mastering (Studio Šišmiš in Velika Gorica, Croatia)
 Dražen Marković – recording assistant

Design
Dario Vitez – design
Srđan Velimirović – design
Saša Midžor – photos

References

2001 albums
Zabranjeno Pušenje albums